The Last Goodnight was an American alternative rock/pop band from Enfield, Connecticut. Their major label debut, Poison Kiss, was released on 28 August 2007. The first single from the album, "Pictures of You", became a pop radio hit in the summer of 2007.

History
In June 2005, the Enfield, Connecticut band, Renata, performed at the Whisky a Go Go in West Hollywood, California. The band caught the eye of RCA Records A&R Sr. VP, Jeff Blue. Blue left RCA to develop the band in his house for three years. Blue brought the band to Virgin Records and eventually produced the debut album which spawned the single "Pictures of You" and "Stay Beautiful" which was written by Blue, Henneberry, and Nadeau.

Discography

Studio albums

Singles

References

Alternative rock groups from Connecticut
American pop rock music groups
Musical groups established in 2006
Musical groups disestablished in 2008